Ani Vardanyan (born May 15, 1991) is an Armenian figure skater. She is the 2005 Armenian national silver medalist.

Competitive highlights

 J = Junior level; QR = Qualifying Round
 Vardanyan did not comete internationally in the 2007–2008 season.

References 

 

Armenian figure skaters
1991 births
Living people
Sportspeople from Yerevan